Monsieur Eek is a short novel by American playwright David Ives, intended for ages 9–12. It was first published September 1, 2001 by HarperCollins. Set in 1609, it is about a chimpanzee who gets arrested for being a French spy. The book is based on a real law in medieval times that allowed animals to be convicted of crimes.

Plot summary	
When a chimpanzee arrives in the tiny coastal city MacOongafoondsen during the Napoleonic Wars he is taken for a Frenchman. Arousing insular prejudice, he is put on trial on suspicion of being a French spy and the thief responsible for a string of local burglaries. He is defended by 13-year-old Emmaline Perth with the help of Flurp, the town fool. Eek ends up being found guilty. However, he is rescued and not hanged. MacOongsafooden's population starts to rapidly rise.

See also
Animal trial

References

2001 American novels
2001 children's books
American children's novels
Children's historical novels
Children's novels about animals
Fictional chimpanzees
Fiction set in 1609
HarperCollins books